Bobbie Goulding Jr. (born 4 March 1993) is a professional rugby league footballer who has played in the 2010s.

Genealogical information
Bobbie Goulding Jr. is the son of the rugby league footballer and coach Bobbie Goulding.

References

1993 births
Living people
Dewsbury Rams players
English rugby league players
Newtown Jets NSW Cup players
Place of birth missing (living people)
Rugby league halfbacks
Wakefield Trinity players